Crew Cuts is a New York-based full service post-production company founded in 1986 by Chuck Willis, Clayton Hemmertt, and Steve Kraftsow, specializing in online and offline editing, visual effects, 3D and motion graphics, audio and sound design, finishing, and aspects of production, for the commercials, shorts, features, and web distribution. The original Crew Cuts was housed in one floor of a townhouse on East 47th Street. Within seven years Crew Cuts had taken over the entire townhouse and moved to its current location, the former New Yorker magazine offices, on the top floor of 28 West 44th Street. The 44th Street space was a showpiece created by architect Peter Woomser with 360-degree views of mid-town Manhattan including 30 Rockefeller Plaza. At one time the editors of Crew Cuts scored Gold, Silver, and Bronze Lions at Cannes in one year. In that same year Pepsi "Boy In The Bottle" was the number 1 rated Super Bowl commercial. At the height of its success, Crew Cuts had offices in New York City, Santa Monica, and San Francisco with an additional award-winning effects company called Quietman helmed by Johnny Semerad and a sound studio called Buzz with partner Mike Marinelli. Crew Cuts clients include: Chase, Comcast, GE, Gillette, HBO, Pepsi, SAP AG, Time Warner Cable, and Verizon. Crew Cuts’ work has gained recognition ranging from the  Clio Awards to the Grammy Awards.

References

External links 
 

Film production companies of the United States
Mass media companies established in 1986
Companies based in New York City
1986 establishments in New York City